The 2017 New York City FC season was the club's third season of competition and their third in the top tier of American soccer, Major League Soccer (MLS). New York City FC played their home games at Yankee Stadium in the New York City borough of The Bronx.

Roster

Player movement

In 
Per Major League Soccer and club policies, terms of the deals do not get disclosed.

Out

Loans 
Per Major League Soccer and club policies, terms of the deals do not get disclosed.

In

Out

Draft picks

Preseason and Friendlies

Major League Soccer season

Eastern Conference

Overall

Results summary

Matches

MLS Cup Playoffs

U.S. Open Cup

Player statistics

|}

References

New York City FC seasons
New York City FC
New York City FC
New York City FC